Fıstıklı is a village in the Armutlu district of the Yalova Province in Turkey.
Fıstıklı is a coastal village located alongside the Armutlu–Gemlik highway. It is 8 kilometers from central Armutlu and 63 kilometers from the capital of the Yalova Province. The main sources of income for the village, which lies on the coast of the Sea of Marmara, are olive tree cultivation and fishing. Located in Fıstıklı are a village health clinic and an elementary school.

External links 
 Armutlu Kaymakamlığı

References 

Villages in Yalova Province
Populated places in Armutlu District